Joseph John Bugel (March 10, 1940 – June 28, 2020) was an American football coach in the National Football League (NFL). For many years, he was acknowledged as the greatest offensive line coach in the league, particularly with the Washington Redskins under head coach Joe Gibbs in the 1980s. He was the architect behind "The Hogs", the Redskins' dominant offensive line that helped lead them to three Super Bowl wins.

Bugel played college football for the Western Kentucky Hilltoppers before becoming a college assistant coach. Prior to joining the Redskins, he served as the offensive line coach or assistant for several other teams, including the Detroit Lions, Houston Oilers, and San Diego Chargers. He was also the head coach of the Phoenix Cardinals and Oakland Raiders, compiling a combined record of 24–56 with them.

Early life
A Pittsburgh native, Bugel was a two-way star in football at Munhall High School. Bugel also played for the Daytona Beach Thunderbirds, a semi-pro team. In 2005, he was inducted into the Pennsylvania Sports Hall of Fame (Western Chapter). While earning his degree in physical education, Bugel was an all-conference guard and linebacker. He earned a master's degree in counseling, also at Western Kentucky.

Coaching career

Early career
Before joining the NFL, Bugel spent time coaching at Ohio State (1974), Iowa State (1973), Navy (1969–1972) and his alma mater, Western Kentucky (1964–1968). Bugel originally entered the NFL in 1975, spending two seasons as the offensive line coach for the Detroit Lions.

Houston Oilers
Bugel joined the Houston Oilers in the same capacity in 1977. During his four seasons with the Oilers, the team set records in rushing and passing. His offensive line was also instrumental in the Oilers' 1979 playoff upset over the San Diego Chargers, led by Dan Fouts. Working without Earl Campbell, Bugel's line, led by All-Pro tackle Leon Gray, made one-playoff-game heroes out of the likes of Rob Carpenter, Ronnie Coleman, Gifford Neilsen and Boobie Clark.

Washington Redskins
In his first stint with the Washington Redskins (1981–1989), he began as the Redskins offensive coordinator in 1981 and was promoted to assistant head coach in 1983. In 1982, he started to develop "The Hogs"—the nickname he penned for his offensive line unit during the Redskins' 1982 training camp. Bugel developed the dominating "Hogs" offensive line that included stalwarts Russ Grimm, Joe Jacoby, Mark May, Jeff Bostic, George Starke and others. Under Bugel's direction, the Redskins scored a then-NFL record 541 points (1983), had four 1,000-yard rushers, one 4,000-yard passer and nine 1,000-yard receivers. Overall, he participated in three Super Bowls, six conference championships and 24 playoff contests. Washington won two of its three Super Bowls (XVII, XXII) while Bugel was on coach Joe Gibbs' staff.

Phoenix Cardinals
Bugel served as head coach of the Phoenix Cardinals from 1990 to 1993.

Oakland Raiders
Bugel spent three seasons with the Oakland Raiders, serving as assistant head coach from 1995 to 1996 before being promoted to head coach for the 1997 season.

San Diego Chargers
From 1998 to 2001, Bugel oversaw the offensive line of the San Diego Chargers, after which he had a two-year respite from football.

Second stint with the Redskins
Bugel returned to the Redskins in 2004 as assistant head coach on offense in Joe Gibbs' return to the team. Bugel's offensive front led the Redskins to consecutive Top 10 finishes in rushing yards per game in the 2005 and 2006 seasons. The Redskins ranked seventh in the NFL and averaged 136.4 yards per game in 2005. The following season (2006), Washington ranked fourth in the NFL with an average of 138.5 yards per contest. Additionally, the Redskins pass protection unit allowed just 19 sacks in 2006, third-lowest in the NFL.

In 2007, Bugel faced his biggest challenge since returning to Washington in 2004. He was without the services of a pair of his starters on the right side and was forced to make a series of adjustments. Right tackle Jon Jansen (ankle surgery) landed on injured reserve after the season opener against Miami Dolphins and right guard Randy Thomas (triceps injury) missed 14 contests. Bugel's 2007 offensive line featured six different lineups and three different starters at the right tackle position but still led the Redskins to finish fifth in the NFC and 12th in the NFL in rushing yards per game (116.9 yards per game) in 2007. Running back Clinton Portis ranked third in the NFC and sixth in the NFL with 1,262 yards and 11 touchdowns in 2007.

Behind Bugel's offensive lines, Portis established himself as one of the premier backs in football. His 2008 totals: 1,487 yards on 342 carries; move him to sixth among active running backs in career rushing yards. With six 100 yard rushing games in 2008, Portis also took over as the leader in most 100-yard rushing games in Redskins history, with 25.

Additionally, Portis's 2008 campaign made it five straight seasons (2004–08) in which Bugel's lines have led a player to eclipse the 1,000-yard rushing mark: Portis, 1,315 in 2004; Portis, 1,513, in 2005; Ladell Betts, 1,154 in 2006; Portis, 1,262 in 2007 and Portis, 1,487 in 2008.

One of Bugel's greatest strengths as an offensive line coach was to fill a void when projected starters sustain injuries, and this skill was on display yet again in 2008. On 2008, despite a rotating cast at the right tackle position and a late-season injury to left tackle Pro Bowler Chris Samuels, the offensive line paved the way for the Redskins running game to rack up 130.9 yards per game, eighth in the NFL. Despite suffering a late-season injury, Samuels continued his stellar career as a member of Bugel's offensive line, earning his sixth Pro Bowl berth in nine active seasons; including four straight during his five seasons under Bugel's tutelage. He retired from the NFL following the end of the 2009 season.

Head coaching record

Personal life
Bugel and his wife, Brenda, had three daughters: Angie, Jennifer and Holly. Holly died from bone cancer on August 21, 2008. Joe died at the age of 80 on June 28, 2020.

References

1940 births
2020 deaths
American football linebackers
Western Kentucky Hilltoppers football players
Western Kentucky Hilltoppers football coaches
Navy Midshipmen football coaches
Iowa State Cyclones football coaches
Ohio State Buckeyes football coaches
Detroit Lions coaches
Houston Oilers coaches
Oakland Raiders coaches
Oakland Raiders head coaches
Phoenix Cardinals head coaches
Washington Redskins coaches
San Diego Chargers coaches
Coaches of American football from Pennsylvania
Players of American football from Pittsburgh
Sportspeople from Pittsburgh